Chamaesphecia nigrifrons is a moth of the family Sesiidae. It is found in central and south-eastern France, Corsica, Luxembourg, South Belgium, south-western Germany, Austria, south-eastern Czech Republic, eastern Slovakia, Hungary, Croatia, Slovenia, former Yugoslavia, Serbia, southern Republic of Macedonia, Bosnia and Herzegovina, Bulgaria, northern Romania, northern Greece, southern Ukraine (the Crimea), Transcaucasia, north-western and southern Turkey and north-western Syria.

The wingspan is 9–18 mm. The forewings are brownish black and the transparent areas are small and covered with hyaline scales. The hindwings have black veins, a broad discal spot and black margins.

The larvae feed on Hypericum perforatum. The live in the root of their host plant for one year. Pupation takes place in the basal part of the dry stem. In autumn, they eject reddish brown sawdust from the galleries at the base of the stems while constructing a tunnel up into an old stem of the host.

References

Moths described in 1911
Sesiidae
Moths of Europe
Moths of Asia